The Orion Clemens House, also known as Mark Twain's House, is a two-story Late Victorian house located at 502 N. Division St. in Carson City, the capital of the U.S. state of Nevada. It was listed on the National Register of Historic Places in 1979.

The listing included two contributing buildings.

The house was built in 1862 by Orion Clemens, a lawyer who served as the first Secretary of the Nevada Territory. It has also been known as the Governor's Mansion from times when Orion was territorial governor pro tem while Governor James W. Nye was absent.  The house often hosted Orion's younger brother Samuel Clemens, better known as Mark Twain.

See also
List of the oldest buildings in Nevada

References 

Houses completed in 1862
Houses on the National Register of Historic Places in Nevada
National Register of Historic Places in Carson City, Nevada
Victorian architecture in Nevada
Houses in Carson City, Nevada
1862 establishments in Nevada Territory